254 (two hundred [and] fifty-four) is the natural number following 253 and preceding 255.

In mathematics
 It is a deficient number, since the sum of its divisors (excluding the same number) is 130 < 254.
 It is a semiprime number. Moreover, in American English, its name has a semiprime number of syllables.
 It is a square-free integer.
 It is a nontotient.
 It is a lazy caterer number.
 It is a congruent number.

References

Integers